Lik Amin Asah is a Mon language chronicle that strictly covers the legendary early history of its kings and founding of the city of Hanthawaddy Pegu (Bago). It was written in 1825 during the First Anglo-Burmese War.

References

Bibliography
 
 

Burmese chronicles